Guangmingcheng railway station is a railway station of the Guangzhou–Shenzhen–Hong Kong Express Rail Link and is located in Guangming District, Shenzhen, Guangdong, China.

China Railway
The Guangzhou–Shenzhen–Hong Kong Express Rail Link is in service. The line starts at the West Kowloon Terminal in Hong Kong and ends at Guangzhou.

Guangzhou-Shenzhen-Hong Kong Express Rail Link
Start station: Hong Kong West Kowloon
End station: Guangzhou South

Shenzhen Metro
It will be served by Line 6 Branch, Line 13 and Line 18 of Shenzhen Metro.

Railway stations in Shenzhen
Railway stations in China opened in 2011